The 2010–11 Minnesota–Duluth Bulldogs men's ice hockey team represented the University of Minnesota Duluth in the 2010–11 NCAA Division I men's ice hockey season.  The Bulldogs were coached by Scott Sandelin, who was in his 11th year as head coach.  His assistant coaches were Brett Larson and Derek Plante.  The team captain was Mike Montgomery and the assistant captains were Jack Connolly and Mike Connolly.  The team played their home games in AMSOIL Arena and were members of the Western Collegiate Hockey Association.

Season
The Bulldogs finished the regular season with a record of 26 wins, 10 losses, and 6 ties. Seeded fourth in the WCHA Tournament, UMD defeated St. Cloud State in the first round, before being upset by tenth-seed Bemidji State in the quarterfinal.  UMD received an at-large bid to the NCAA Tournament, where they were the third seed in the East Regional.  The Bulldogs upset regional No. 2 seed Union and No. 1 seed Yale on the way to the Frozen Four in St. Paul, Minnesota.  In the national semifinal, UMD defeated Notre Dame, 4–3, on the back of 3 power-play goals and 31 saves from goaltender Kenny Reiter.  With a Kyle Schmidt goal at 3:22 in overtime, the Bulldogs defeated Michigan to win the school's first national championship.  Forward J. T. Brown was named the tournament's Most Outstanding Player, while defenseman Justin Faulk and forward Kyle Schmidt were also named to the All-Tournament Team.

Departures

Recruiting

Roster
Source:

|}
Note: a knee injury forced Cody Danberg to miss the entire season.

Standings

Schedule and results

|-
!colspan=12 style=";" | 

|-
!colspan=12 style=";" | Regular Season

|-
!colspan=12 style=";" | 

|-
!colspan=12 style=";" |

National Championship game

Statistics

Skaters

Goalies

Rankings

Note: USCHO did not release a poll in weeks 11, or 24.

Awards and honors

Players drafted into the NHL

2008 NHL Entry Draft

† incoming freshman

References

2010-11
Minnesota Duluth
Minnesota Duluth
Minnesota Duluth
Minnesota Duluth
Minnesota Duluth Bulldogs
Minnesota Duluth Bulldogs